This list of notable people with breast cancer includes people who made significant contributions to their chosen field and who were diagnosed with breast cancer at some point in their lives, as confirmed by public information. Diagnosis dates are listed where the information is known. Breast cancer is the second most common cancer in women after skin cancer. According to the United States National Cancer Institute, the rate of new cases of female breast cancer was 129.1 per 100,000 women per year. The death rate was 19.9 per 100,000 women per year. These rates are age-adjusted and based on 2014–2018 cases and 2015–2019 deaths. Approximately 12.9 percent of women will be diagnosed with female breast cancer at some point during their lifetime, based on 2016–2018 data. In 2018, there were an estimated 3,676,262 women living with female breast cancer in the United States.

Acting and related fields

Business

Miscellaneous

Music

Politics and government

Royalty

Science

Sports

Television and radio

Visual arts

Writing

See also
List of breast cancer patients by survival status

Notes

Breast cancer 
 
Lists of people by medical condition
Medical lists